Dowbaneh (also Romanized as Do Baneh; also known as Donbeh, Downbeh, and Dunheh) is a village in Maharlu Rural District, Kuhenjan District, Sarvestan County, Fars Province, Iran. At the 2006 census, its population was 120, in 28 families.

References 

Populated places in Sarvestan County